Keith Eugene Woodall (August 4, 1926 – May 17, 1981) was a Canadian ice hockey goaltender who competed in the 1956 Winter Olympics.

Woodall was a member of the Kitchener-Waterloo Dutchmen who won the bronze medal for Canada in ice hockey at the 1956 Winter Olympics

References

External links

Keith Woodall's profile at Sports Reference.com

1926 births
1981 deaths
Canadian ice hockey goaltenders
Ice hockey people from Ontario
Ice hockey players at the 1956 Winter Olympics
Medalists at the 1956 Winter Olympics
Olympic bronze medalists for Canada
Olympic ice hockey players of Canada
Olympic medalists in ice hockey